Lasiopetalum compactum, is a species of flowering plant in the family Malvaceae and is endemic to the south-west of Western Australia. It is an erect shrub with leathery, narrowly oblong leaves and cymes of white to pinkish flowers.

Description
The upper surfaces of the leaves is more or less glabrous and the lower surface is covered with woolly, star-shaped hairs, the mid-rib prominent. Flowering occurs from July to October.

Taxonomy
Lasiopetalum compactum was first formally described in 1974 by Susan Paust in the journal Nuytsia from specimens collected near Ravensthorpe in 1968. The specific epithet (compactum) "refers to the inflorescence".

Distribution and habitat
This lasiopetalum grows on rocky hillsides and among granite rocks, between the Fitzgerald River and Mount Burdett in the Esperance Plains and Mallee biogeographic regions of south-western Western Australia.

Conservation status
Lasiopetalum compactum is listed as "not threatened" by the Government of Western Australia Department of Biodiversity, Conservation and Attractions.

References

compactum
Malvales of Australia
Flora of Western Australia
Plants described in 1974